The brown-spotted moray (Gymnothorax fuscomaculatus) is a moray eel found in coral reefs in the Pacific and Indian Oceans. It was first named by Schultz in 1953 and is also commonly known as the freckled moray.

References

External links
 Fishes of Australia : Gymnothorax fuscomaculatus

Gymnothorax
Marine fish of Northern Australia
Fish described in 1953